Gertrud Kille (17 January 1925 – 6 August 1978) was a German athlete. She competed in the women's shot put at the 1952 Summer Olympics.

References

External links
 

1925 births
1978 deaths
Athletes (track and field) at the 1952 Summer Olympics
German female shot putters
Olympic athletes of Germany
Place of birth missing
20th-century German women